The burmball is a hybrid between the Burmese python and the ball python.

References

Python (genus)
Hybrid animals